Oksana Kalashnikova and Danka Kovinić were the defending champions, but both players chose not to participate.

Cindy Burger and Laura Pous Tió won the title, defeating Nicole Melichar and Renata Voráčová in the final, 6–1, 6–3.

Seeds

Draw

References 
 Draw

Lorraine Open 88 - Doubles